Kintail is an area of mountains in the Northwest Highlands of Scotland, located in the Highland Council area. It consists of the mountains to the north of Glen Shiel and the A87 road between the heads of Loch Duich and Loch Cluanie; its boundaries, other than Glen Shiel, are generally taken to be the valleys of Strath Croe and Gleann Gaorsaic to the north and An Caorann Mòr to the east. Although close to the west coast the mountains lie on the main east–west watershed of Scotland, as the northern side of Kintail drains via Glen Affric to the east coast.

Kintail gives its name to the Kintail National Scenic Area, one of the forty national scenic areas in Scotland, which are defined so as to identify areas of exceptional scenery and to ensure its protection from inappropriate development. The designated area includes the mountains of Kintail proper, as well as the southern side of Glen Shiel from the site of the Battle of Glen Shiel west to the shores of Loch Duich, and extends west to as far as Dornie on the north shore of Loch Duich. The designated area covers 17,149 ha in total, of which 16,070 ha is on land, with a further 1079 ha being marine (i.e. below low tide level), consisting of the sea loch of Loch Duich. The area is considered to encapsulate the scenery of the west highlands, being composed of ridges and peaks that rise steeply from narrow glens and the sea.

The main settlement within Kintail is Morvich, located to the northwest of the mountains, just off the A87 road. Morvich serves as the location of the base for Kintail Mountain Rescue Team, as well a campsite operated by The Caravan Club.

Mountains

According to legend, the five sisters are the oldest of seven sisters, as the youngest two sisters fell in love with two Irish princes who washed ashore during a storm. Their father would only allow them to marry once the older sisters has also been married, and so the princes agreed to send their other five brothers once they had returned to Ireland with their new wives. Although the princes failed to appear, the five sisters continued to wait, eventually turning into mountains to extend their vigil into eternity. The five distinctly pointed summits (Sgùrr na Ciste Duibhe, Sgùrr na Càrnach, Sgùrr Fhuaran, Sgùrr nan Saighead and Sgurr na Moraich) are a well-known landmark and a popular hillwalking expedition. Three of the Five Sisters, which are all over 3,000 feet, are classified as full Munros, with the other two being subsidiary Munro tops.

The ridge containing the Five Sisters continues unbroken to the east where it takes in a further three Munros (Sgùrr a' Bhealaich Dheirg, Sàileag and Aonach Meadhoin) which are often known as the Brothers of Kintail. Beinn Fhada (Ben Attow) is the other main mountain in the area.

Ownership
Most of Kintail is owned by the National Trust for Scotland (NTS). The estate was purchased for the NTS in 1944 by Percy Unna, the Scottish Mountaineering Club president who also acquired Glen Coe for the Trust. NTS operate an outdoor education centre in Morvich, which provides accommodation for groups such as school parties undertaking field studies and outdoor pursuits.

Wildlife and nature
Bird species found within Kintail include golden eagles, merlins and black-throated divers. Otters are relatively common, and pine martens also inhabit the wooded parts of the area, whilst red deer can be seen on the lower slopes of the mountains. Kintail is also home to herd of feral goats, thought to be descendants of goats first brought to Britain in around 3000 BCE by neolithic farmers. Due to this origin they are considered non-native, and as there are currently no top predators for goats NTS are considering a cull to reduce the herd, which currently numbers around 100, in order to reduce pressures on vegetation and allow the area of land covered by native woodland to increase.

Historical landmarks
A 1.75 m high, 2,000-year-old standing stone known as Cill Fhearchair stands within a burial ground near Shiel Bridge.

A large boulder lying on the steep southwest slopes of Sgùrr na Ciste Duibhe is known as "Prince Charlie's Stone", as it is the place where Charles Edward Stuart spent a day in the summer of 1746 hiding from government troops. At the time he had a £30,000 bounty on his head due to fleeing after the Battle of Culloden.

References

External links
 National Trust for Scotland – Kintail & Morvich
 Kintail guide (with walking routes)

Mountains and hills of the Northwest Highlands
National Trust for Scotland properties
National scenic areas of Scotland
Tourist attractions in Highland (council area)
Environment of Highland (council area)
Clan Mackenzie
Parishes in Ross and Cromarty